Sreemoyee is an Indian Bengali serial that aired on Star Jalsha and is also digitally available on Disney+ Hotstar. It was produced by Magic Moments Motion Pictures Pvt. Ltd  of Saibal Banerjee and Leena Gangopadhyay, which premiered on 10 June 2019. The show starred Indrani Haldar in the titular role. After a successful run of two-and-a-half years it went off-air on 19 December 2021.

Plot
Sreemoyee is a middle-aged housewife. However, on knowing that her husband Anindya cheated her, having an affair with his colleague June, initially she is heart-broken but soon she realises and sets out to create a new identity for herself while June starts creating troubles for her. She divorces with Anindya while he marries June. She is also supported by her college love, Rohit Sen. The story follows how she tackles the problems caused by June and becomes a successful businesswoman in ethnic fabric and handicrafts.

Cast

Main
 Indrani Haldar as Sreemoyee Bose Sen – A businesswoman; Mitali's daughter; Dipu's sister; Anindo's ex-wife; Rohit's widow; Jumbo, Dinka and Dithi's mother (2019–2021)
Tota Roy Chowdhury as Rohit Sen – A famous NRI businessman; Arpita's cousin; Sreemoyee's second husband. (2020-2021) (Dead)
 Sudip Mukherjee as Anindo "Bua" Sengupta – Arindam and Patralekha's elder son; Anindita and Ronnie's brother; Sreemoyee's ex-husband; June's second husband; Jumbo, Dinka and Dithi's father (2019–2021)
 Ushasie Chakraborty as June Sengupta – Shombit's ex-wife; Anindo's second wife; Bukan's mother; Jumbo, Dinka and Dithi's step-mother (2019–2021)
 Saptarshi Maulik as Pratyush "Dinka" Sengupta – Sreemoyee and Anindo's younger son; Jumbo and Dithi's brother; Kia's ex-husband; Arna's second husband; Sankalpo's close friend (2019–2021)

Recurring
 Roosha Chatterjee as Arna Chatterjee Sengupta – Animesh and Subhashree's daughter; Sankalpo's widow; Dinka's second wife; Sreemoyee's well-wisher (2019–2021)
 Aishi Bhattacharya as Dr. Dithi Sengupta Roy – Sreemoyee and Anindo's daughter; Jumbo and Dinka's sister; Chhotu's wife (2019–2021)
 Arnab Banerjee as Aitijhyo "Chhotu" Roy – Arojit and Mandira's younger son; Bulbuli's brother; Dithi's husband (2021)
 Debolina Mukherjee as Dr. Ankita Bose Sengupta – Amitava and Madhubani's daughter; Jumbo's wife (2019–2021)
 Rohit Samanta as Dr. Aniruddha "Jumbo" Sengupta – Sreemoyee and Anindo's elder son; Dinka and Dithi's brother; Ankita's husband (2019–2021)
 Ashok Bhattacharya as Adityadeb Sengupta – Patralekha's husband; Anindo, Anindita and Ronnie's father; Jumbo, Dinka, Dithi, Sakshi, Gungun and Googli's grandfather (2019-2021)
 Chitra Sen as Patralekha Sengupta – Adityadeb's wife; Anindo, Anindita and Ronnie's mother; Jumbo, Dinka, Dithi, Sakshi, Gungun and Googli's grandmother (2019-2021)
 Anindita Saha Kapileshwari as Anindita "Buni" Sengupta Chakraborty – Adityadeb and Patralekha's daughter; Anindo and Ronnie's sister; Upal's wife; Googli and Gungun's mother (2019–2021)
 Bharat Kaul as Upal Chakraborty – Anindita's husband; Googli and Gungun's father; Sreemoyee's well-wisher (2019–2021)
Anindya Chakrabarti as Ronnie Sengupta – Adityadeb and Patralekha's younger son; Anindo and Anindita's brother; Paroma's husband; Sakshi's father (2021)
Poushmita Gowsami as Paroma Sengupta – Ronnie's wife; Sakshi's mother (2021)
Sohini Banerjee as Sakshi Sengupta – Ronnie and Paroma's daughter (2021)
 Debapratim Dasgupta as Arojit Roy – Mandira's husband; Chhotu and Bulbuli's father (2021)
 Moyna Mukherjee as Mandira Roy – Arojit's wife; Chhotu and Bulbuli's mother (2021)
 Prity Biswas as Kakoli Roy – Chhotu and Bulbuli's widowed sister-in-law (2021)
 Nishantika Das as Bulbuli Roy – Arojit and Mandira's daughter; Chhotu's sister (2021)
 Alokananda Roy as Mitali Bose – Sreemoyee and Dipu's mother; Jumbo, Dinka, Dithi and Maharaj's grandmother (2019)
 Ambarish Bhattacharya as Pradip Bose aka Dipu – Mitali's son; Sreemoyee's brother; Roosha's husband; Maharaj's father (2019, 2021)
 Samata Das as Roosha Bose – Pradip's wife; Maharaj's mother (2019)
 Ayush Das as Maharaj Bose – Pradip and Rusha's son; Sreemoyee's nephew; Jumbo, Dinka and Dithi's cousin (2019).
 Anushree Das as Antara Bose – Sreemoyee's best friend; Upal's former love interest (2019–2021)
 Debottam Majumdar as Sankalpo Chatterjee – Arna's late husband; Dinka's close friend (Deceased) (2019–2020)
 Sandip Chakraborty as Shombit Guha – June's ex-husband; Bukan's father (2019–2021)
 Abhirup Sen as Abhirup Guha aka Bukan – June and Shombit's son (2019–2020)
 Chandan Sen as Amitava Bose – Madhubani's husband; Ankita's father (2019)
 Malabika Sen as Madhubani Bose – Amitava's wife; Ankita's mother (2019)
 Kushal Chakraborty as Animesh Chatterjee – Subhashree's husband; Arna's father (2019–2020)
 Manjushree Ganguly as Subhashree Chatterjee – Animesh's wife; Arna's mother (2019–2020)
 Sharmila Das as Mithu Das – Sengupta family's domestic help; Sreemoyee's well-wisher; Mou's mother (2019–2021)
 Ashmee Ghosh as Mohua Das – Mithu's daughter (2019)
 Madhurima Basak as Kia Sen – An assistant in Dinka's music band; Dinka's ex-wife (2020–2021)
 Suman Banerjee as Debalok Dasgupta – a lawyer (2019)
 Debolina Dutta Mukherjee as Swarnachapa Sengupta – a lawyer (2020–2021)
 Sohail Dutta as Sarbajit Ghosh – Prosenjit and Arpita's son; Dithi's college rival (2020–2021)
 Rajashree Bhowmik as Arpita Sen Ghosh – Rohit's cousin; Prosenjit's wife; Sarbajit's mother (2020, 2021)
 Rahul Chakraborty as Prosenjit Ghosh – a lawyer; Arpita's husband; Sarbajit's father (2020–2021)
 Joyjit Banerjee as Joyshankar Banerjee – a lawyer (2021)
 Runa Bandopadhyay as Hemlata Sen – Rohit and Arpita's elder aunt (2021)
 Sujoy Prosad Chatterjee as anchor (2020)
 Dev Chhat as Police officer – Rohit's close friend (2020-2021)
 Shaktipada Dey as a lawyer (2021)

Adaptations

Reception

Ratings

References

Bengali-language television programming in India
2019 Indian television series debuts
Star Jalsha original programming
2021 Indian television series endings